The 2019 Liverpool City Council election took place on 2 May 2019 to elect members of Liverpool City Council in England. This was the same day as other local elections.

Due to the 'in thirds' system of election, one third of the council were up for election, with comparisons to previous results made with the corresponding vote at the 2015 Liverpool City Council election.

Council composition
Prior to the election the composition of the council was:

After the election the composition of the council was:

Retiring councillors

Parties Standing

Results

Allerton and Hunts Cross

Anfield

Belle Vale

Central

Childwall

Church

Clubmoor

County

Cressington

Croxteth

Everton

Fazakerley

Greenbank

Kensington and Fairfield

Kirkdale

Knotty Ash

Mossley Hill

Norris Green

Prospective  candidate Liam Moore stepped down over allegations of anti-Semitism and homophobia.

Old Swan

Picton

Princes Park

Riverside

Speke–Garston

St Michaels

Tuebrook and Stoneycroft

Warbreck

Wavertree

West Derby

Woolton

Yew Tree

By Elections

Old Swan 19 September 2019

Caused by the resignation of Cllr. Peter Brennan (Labour, last elected 2 May 2019)

Princes Park 17 October 2019

Caused by the resignation of Cllr. Tim Moore (Labour, last elected 5 May 2016)

Clubmoor 12 December 2019

Caused by the resignation of Cllr. James Noakes (Labour, last elected 5 May 2016)

Picton 12 December 2019

Caused by the resignation of Cllr. Paul Kenyon (Labour, last elected 3 May 2018) following allegations of anti-semitism in the Labour Party.

See also

 Liverpool City Council
 Liverpool Town Council elections 1835 - 1879
 Liverpool City Council elections 1880–present
 Mayors and Lord Mayors of Liverpool 1207 to present
 History of local government in England
 Elections in the United Kingdom

Notes

References

 

2019 English local elections
2019
2010s in Liverpool
May 2019 events in the United Kingdom